Pleuroceras solare is a species of ammonite from the lower Jurassic, upper Pliensbachian period (189.6 ± 1.5 – 183.0 ± 1.5 Mya).  Species of this genus were fast-moving nektonic carnivore. Shells can reach about 45 mm in diameter.

Subspecies
 Pleuroceras solare solitarium Simpson, 1855
 Pleuroceras solare trapezoidiformis Maubeuge, 1951

Distribution
Fossils of this species have been found in the Jurassic of Algeria, Austria, France, Germany and Spain.

References 
 Paleobiology Database

External links
 The Fossil Forum
 Trifoss

Jurassic ammonites
Jurassic Austria
Jurassic France
Jurassic Germany
Jurassic Spain
Eoderoceratoidea